Christian Gerber (born 24 May 1952, in Switzerland) is an orthopedic surgeon, physician, scientist and medical teacher in orthopedic surgery. He is the current Chairman of the Department of Orthopedics at the University of Zürich, Switzerland.

After studying medicine at the University of Berne, he was trained in orthopedic surgery in several Swiss hospitals, including the Davos Hospital and the University Hospital of Berne. He specialized in shoulder surgery at the University of Texas, San Antonio in 1984 and subsequently trained on tumor foot and ankle surgery as well as pediatric orthopedics in Paris in 1985.

From 1985 to 1991 he served as a consultant at the Department of Orthopedics at the University of Berne, where in 1991 he was promoted to associate professor in orthopedic surgery. In 1992, he was appointed chief of the Department of Orthopedics in Fribourg and since 1995 he has worked in the Balgrist University Hospital in Zürich, where he holds the position of medical director and Chairman of the Department of Orthopedics.

Christian Gerber created the RESORTHO foundation for research and education in musculoskeletal disorders to support the academic development of residents and junior staff. He also founded the international Harvard–Balgrist shoulder fellowship. He also established the Balgrist Campus, a privately funded musculoskeletal research and development institution based in Zürich.

Beside his continuous clinical activity, he has also described novel surgical procedures such as the latissimus dorsi transfer for a pseudoparalytic shoulder and he has described several important pathologies, such as the isolated rupture of the subscapularis tendon. As a result of his clinical experience, he developed clinical tests, such as the Gerber Lift Off test for a subscapular insufficiency. He is author of >300 scientific articles that were cited over 15000 times (as per Feb. 2014). He has received many awards for his clinical and research work including  the Neer Award of the American Shoulder And Elbow Surgeons (ASES) on four occasions. In 2007 he received the Kappa Delta OREF Clinical Research award Award for the lifetime work “Rotator Cuff Disease: From Scientific Understanding to Patient Care”. In 2014, he received the ORS Arthur Steindler Award.

References

External links
C. Gerber on google scholar
Relevant articles by C. Gerber

1952 births
Swiss orthopedic surgeons
Living people
Academic staff of the University of Zurich
University of Bern alumni